The Order of Sultan Sharafuddin Idris Shah (Bahasa Melayu: Darjah Kebesaran Sultan Sharafuddin Idris Shah) is an order awarded by Sultan of Selangor as a reward for general services to the sultan and state of Selangor. It was founded on 14 December 2002 to replace the abolished Order of Sultan Salahuddin Abdul Aziz Shah. The order is awarded to high-ranking individuals who have contributed excellence to the Sultan of Selangor and His Majesty's Government.

Classes 
The four classes of appointment to the Order are, in descending order of precedence:
Knight Grand Companion or Dato' Setia Sultan Sharafuddin Idris Shah (SSIS)
Knight Companion or Dato' Sultan Sharafuddin Idris Shah (DSIS)
Companion or Setia Sultan Sharafuddin Idris Shah (SIS)
Member or Ahli Sultan Sharafuddin Idris Shah (AIS)

Dato' Setia Sultan Sharafuddin Idris Shah (SSIS) can only be awarded to two people at one time and the maximum number of recipients is 40 people.
Dato' Sultan Sharafuddin Idris Shah (DSIS) can be awarded up to 20 people at one time and the maximum number of recipients is 600 people.

Styles 
Male recipients of Dato' Setia Sultan Sharafuddin Idris Shah (SSIS) will carry the title Dato' Setia and their female spouse Datin Setia. Female recipients of the order will carry the title Datin Paduka Setia. Husband to the female recipients will not carry any title. 
Male recipients of Dato' Sultan Sharafuddin Idris Shah (DSIS) will carry the title Dato' and their female spouse Datin. Female recipients of the order will carry the title Datin Paduka. Husband to the female recipients will not carry any title.

Recipients of Setia Sultan Sharafuddin Idris Shah (SIS) and Ahli Sultan Sharafuddin Idris Shah (AIS) will not carry any title.

Appearances

Knight Grand Companion 
It is awarded in a set of breast star, a collar, a badge and a yellow coloured sash with two red stripes, worn from right shoulder to the left waist.

The collar is made of gold-plated silver. It is 132 cm long and worn on the same length at the front and back. This necklace has 14 connecting chain links. The two middle chains contain compositions of two crossed Selangor flags. Six of the remaining chain links are round and the other six are nonagon in shape, and are arranged alternately. The round shaped links contain the word "Sultan Idris Shah" while the rest contain "Selangor Darul Ehsan" phrase. They are written in Islamic calligraphy. Each of these compositions are made of enamel.

The breast star is made of gold-plated silver, its surface length is 9 cm long and has nine fractions. In the center of this star is the word "Sultan Idris Shah Selangor", written both in rumi and khat, with red enamel as its base.

The badge has the same design as the breast star. Its surface length is 6 cm long. The center part of the badge is oval in shape, 2.07 cm wide and 3.05 cm high. It has engraving of the word "Sultan Idris Shah Selangor" in rumi on red enamel background. At the top part of the badge, there is a decoration in the form of the Sultan's crown which is 2.2 cm in height. This badge is made to be suspended on the collar or sash.

The sash is made of yellow silk cloth 11.7 cm in width for male, 7.7 cm for female, with two 0.2 cm wide red stripes on each sides.

Knight Companion 
It is awarded in a set of breast star, a badge and a red coloured sash with two yellow stripes, worn from right shoulder to the left waist.

The shape of the breast star is the same as the Knight Grand Companion's. The center of the star contains the royal symbol. The symbol is shown on emerald green background, replacing the engraved script in red enamel background in the former. The badge is also of the same size and shape as Knight Grand Companion's but with emerald green enamel background.

The sash is made of red silk cloth 11.7 cm in width for male, 7.7 cm for female, with two 0.3 cm wide yellow stripes on each sides.

Notable Recipients 
 Tengku Amir Shah (SSIS, 13 January 2011)
 Tengku Zerafina binti Sultan Sharafuddin Idris Shah (SSIS, 10 April 2003)
 Abdul Gani Patail (SSIS, 2 December 2004)
 Tan Sri Dato' Setia Ambrin Buang (SSIS, 11 December 2005)
 Admiral Tan Sri Dato' Setia Mohammad Anwar Hj Mohd Nor (SSIS, 16 March 2006)
 Tengku Zatashah binti Sultan Sharafuddin Idris Shah (SSIS, 21 January 2010)
 Khalid Abu Bakar (SSIS, 16 February 2012)
 Dato' Setia Colin Salem Parbury (SSIS, 11 December 2013)
 Dato' Setia Aubry Rahim Mennesson (SSIS, 11 December 2013)
 Abdul Wahid Omar (SSIS, 11 December 2016)
 Tengku Permaisuri Norashikin (SSIS, 3 June 2019)
 Syed Haizam Hishamuddin Putra Jamalullail bin Syed Anwar Jamalullail (DSIS, 11 December 2019)

See also 
Orders, decorations, and medals of the Malaysian states and federal territories#Selangor
List of post-nominal letters (Selangor)

References 

Orders of chivalry of Malaysia
Orders, decorations, and medals of Selangor
Awards established in 2002
2002 establishments in Malaysia
Selangor